The Bridge of Las Tres Fuentes (the three fountains) is a bridge pattern by disciples of Gustave Eiffel originally constructed in iron. In the 20th century it was covered with concrete. It is near Gil Marquez, Almonaster la Real.

Tres
Railway bridges in Spain